Skate Helena (formerly known as the Helena Pajović Cup) is an annual figure skating competition held in December or January in Belgrade, Serbia. Named after Helena Pajović, the event became part of the European Criterium in 2008. Skaters may compete in men's and ladies' singles on the senior, junior, novice, and lower levels. Ice dancing was discontinued after 2003.

Senior medalists

Men

Ladies

Ice dancing

Junior medalists

Men

Ladies

Ice dancing

Advanced novice medalists

Men

Ladies

Ice dancing

References

External links 
 European Criterium

International figure skating competitions hosted by Serbia